Southern Pacific Railroad Passenger Coach Car-S.P. X7 dates from c. 1875 and was used until 1938.  It is a former passenger coach of the Southern Pacific Railroad's Southern Division.  The railway vehicle was listed on the National Register of Historic Places in 2000, at which time it was located in Yuma, Arizona.

It is a representative example of the type of passenger coach car used when the Southern Pacific Railway entered Arizona, in September 1877, at Yuma Crossing.

A historic photo documents Geronimo beside a similar coach car in Texas in 1886.

See also
 List of historic properties in Yuma, Arizona 
 Southern Pacific Railroad Depot (Yuma, Arizona) – also NRHP listed.
 Southern Pacific Freight Depot (Yuma, Arizona) – also NRHP listed.
 National Register of Historic Places listings in Yuma County, Arizona

References

Rail passenger cars of the United States
Railway vehicles on the National Register of Historic Places in Arizona
Southern Pacific Railroad
Buildings and structures in Yuma, Arizona
National Register of Historic Places in Yuma County, Arizona